The 2021–22 Korvpalli Meistriliiga (KML) season, also known as PAF Korvpalli Meistriliiga for sponsorship reasons, was the 96th season of the top-tier basketball league in Estonia. The regular season began on 1 October 2021 and finished on 24 April 2022. The play-offs started on 26 April and finished on 26 May with Pärnu Sadam winning their first KML title.

Teams

Venues and locations

Personnel and sponsorship

Coaching changes

Regular season

In the regular season, teams played against each other once, with all results from the regular season of the 2021–22 Estonian-Latvian Basketball League being carried over.

League table
</noinclude></onlyinclude>

Results

Playoffs

Playoffs series are best-of-five. The first team to win three games wins the series.

See also
 2021–22 Estonian-Latvian Basketball League
 2021–22 VTB United League
 2021–22 Basketball Champions League
 2021–22 FIBA Europe Cup

References

External links
Official website 

Korvpalli Meistriliiga seasons
Estonian
KML